Signature Place is a 36-story skyscraper located on 1st Street South in downtown St. Petersburg, Florida. Construction started in December 2007 and finished in 2009. At 116.1 m (381 ft.), Signature Place is the third tallest skyscraper and the second tallest residential skyscraper in St. Petersburg. The residential skyscraper contains 243 residential units.

See also 
List of tallest buildings in St. Petersburg

Notes

Buildings and structures in St. Petersburg, Florida
Residential condominiums in the United States
Residential buildings completed in 2009
Skyscrapers in Florida
Residential skyscrapers in Florida
2009 establishments in Florida